Yelkhi Surlan (also Romanized as Yelkhī Sūrlan; also known as Īlkhī Sūrkan) is a village in Golidagh Rural District, Golidagh District, Maraveh Tappeh County, Golestan Province, Iran. At the 2006 census, its population was 207, in 34 families.

References 

Populated places in Maraveh Tappeh County